Alfa may refer to:

Businesses and organisations

Broadcasting
 Alfa Radio, a Macedonian radio station
 XHFAJ-FM, a Mexico City radio station better known as Alfa 91.3
 Alfa TV, a premium television service available in Cyprus
 Alfa TV (North Macedonia)

Industrial
 ALFA (Mexico), a Mexican industrial conglomerate
 Alfa Aesar, a chemical supply company

Science and technology
 Alfa (Lebanon), a Lebanese telecom company
 Alfa Financial Software, a British software company
 Alfa Romeo, an Italian luxury automobile manufacturer founded as A.L.F.A.

Other businesses
 Alfa (cigarette), an Italian brand
 Alfa Brewery, a Dutch brewery
 Alfa Group Consortium, a Russian privately owned investment group
 Alfa-Bank, the Alfa Group corporate treasury
 Alfamart, an Indonesian retail company
 Alfa Records, a Japanese record label
 Alfa Co., a subsidiary of the Al Faisaliah Group

People
 Isaac Alfa, a retired Nigerian Air Force officer
 El Alfa, a Dominican recording artist

Other uses
 Alfa, code word for the letter "A" in the NATO phonetic alphabet, International Code of Signals and related alphabet codes
 Alfa class submarine, NATO name for Soviet Union/Russian Navy Project 705 submarines
 ALFA (XACML), a pseudocode language used in the formulation of access-control policies
 Alfa (rocket), a 1970s Italian ballistic missile
 ALFA (band), a boy band in Myanmar
 ALFA (rowing), an international indoor rowing competition in Estonia
 Alfa (title), a title given to distinguished figures in Guinea
 Subtropical Storm Alfa, the first subtropical storm of the 1973 Atlantic hurricane season
 Liberal Conservative Reformers, a political party in Germany formerly called ALFA
 Flugschule Wings Alfa, an Austrian hang glider

See also
 Alpha (disambiguation)
 Alfalfa